Sofala is a 1947 painting by Australian artist Russell Drysdale. The painting depicts the main street of the New South Wales town of Sofala. The painting won the Wynne Prize for 1947. The Art Gallery of New South Wales describe the work as "one of [his] finest paintings, representing the artist at the height of his powers." and that "the painting transcends literal description of a particular place to become an expression of the quintessential qualities of an inland Australian country town".

Drysdale painted the work after a trip in 1947 with fellow painter Donald Friend to the country around Bathurst, including the villages of Hill End and Sofala. In Sofala, Drysdale made some sketches of the main street and took some photographs. On return to Sydney, both Friend and Drysdale worked on a painting of the main street. Friend said of Drysdale:

The painting was exhibited in the Macquarie Galleries in December 1947. During this exhibition, Hal MissinghamDirector of the Art Gallery of New South Walesnominated the painting for the Wynne Prize. The awarding of the Prize to Sofala "marked a dramatic move away from the traditional pastoral imagery of Australian landscape painting". Following the award the art critic for the Sydney Morning Herald said of the work:

The painting was originally purchased by John Stephen, Drysdale's brother-in-law. It was acquired in 1952 by the Art Gallery of New South Wales in Sydney.

Several of the buildings in the painting can still be seen in Denison St, Sofala, including the Royal Hotel in the left foreground and the former hospital in the middle distance.

References

Paintings by Russell Drysdale
1947 paintings
Collections of the Art Gallery of New South Wales
Wynne Prize